Serbia joined the United Nations on November 1, 2000, as the Federal Republic of Yugoslavia. Originally the previous Yugoslav state was one of the original 51 member states of the United Nations.

Background
The Federal Republic of Yugoslavia was established on 28 April 1992 by the remaining Yugoslav republics of Montenegro and Serbia, claimed itself as the legal successor state of the former Socialist Federal Republic of Yugoslavia; however, on 30 May 1992, United Nations Security Council Resolution 757 was adopted, by which it imposed international sanctions on the Federal Republic of Yugoslavia due to its role in the Yugoslav Wars, and noted that "the claim by the Federal Republic of Yugoslavia (Serbia and Montenegro) to continue automatically the membership of the former Socialist Federal Republic of Yugoslavia in the United Nations has not been generally accepted," and on 22 September 1992, United Nations General Assembly Resolution A/RES/47/1 was adopted, by which it considered that "the Federal Republic of Yugoslavia (Serbia and Montenegro) cannot continue automatically the membership of the former Socialist Federal Republic of Yugoslavia in the United Nations," and therefore decided that "the Federal Republic of Yugoslavia (Serbia and Montenegro) should apply for membership in the United Nations and that it shall not participate in the work of the General Assembly". The Federal Republic of Yugoslavia refused to comply with the resolution for many years, but following the ousting of President Slobodan Milošević from office, it applied for membership, and was admitted to the UN on 1 November 2000. On 4 February 2003, the Federal Republic of Yugoslavia had its official name changed to Serbia and Montenegro, following the adoption and promulgation of the Constitutional Charter of Serbia and Montenegro by the Assembly of the Federal Republic of Yugoslavia.

On the basis of a referendum held on 21 May 2006, Montenegro declared independence from Serbia and Montenegro on 3 June 2006. In a letter dated on the same day, the President of Serbia informed the United Nations Secretary-General that the membership of Serbia and Montenegro in the UN was being continued by Serbia, following Montenegro's declaration of independence, in accordance with the Constitutional Charter of Serbia and Montenegro. Montenegro was admitted to the UN on 28 June 2006.

Since 1999, Kosovo had been administered by the UN after the end of the Kosovo war; however, on 17 February 2008, Kosovo declared independence from Serbia as the Republic of Kosovo. While the United States, the United Kingdom and France have recognized this act, Serbia and some of the international community—most notably Russia, China, Algeria, Cuba, Egypt, Bosnia and Herzegovina, Spain, India, Brazil, South Africa, Nigeria, Indonesia, Iran, Jamaica, Greece and Mexico—have not recognised Kosovo's declaration of independence. As of 2022, Kosovo has yet to become a member-state or observer-state of the  United Nations.

See also 

 Member states of the United Nations
 Foreign relations of Serbia
 Yugoslavia and the United Nations

References

External links
 Official website of the Permanent Mission of Serbia to the UN
 Official website of the Ministry of Foreign Affairs of Serbia

 
Foreign relations of Serbia